George Arthur Gallimore (August 1886 – 1949) was an English professional footballer who made more than 100 appearances in the Football League playing for Stoke, Sheffield United and Birmingham. He played as a left-sided or centre forward.

Career
Gallimore was born in East Vale, Longton, Staffordshire. He played local football before signing for Stoke in 1903. He became a useful forward for a struggling Stoke side, scoring 17 goals in 85 matches. With Stoke in financial difficulties in 1907–08, he and teammate Albert Sturgess joined Sheffield United in May 1908, but he failed to establish himself in his two seasons with the "Blades". He then signed for Second Division club Birmingham in 1910. He began the 1910–11 season in the starting eleven at outside left, but lost his place in December 1910 and rarely played again. He moved back to non-league football with Leek in 1911. Gallimore died in Stoke-on-Trent in 1949 aged about 63.

Career statistics
Source:

References

1886 births
1949 deaths
People from Longton, Staffordshire
Footballers from Stoke-on-Trent
English footballers
Association football forwards
Stoke City F.C. players
Sheffield United F.C. players
Birmingham City F.C. players
English Football League players
Date of death missing
Leek F.C. players